is a former racing driver from Saitama Prefecture, Japan.

Racing career
As a youth, Suzuki won the All-Japan Kart Championships in 1975 and 1976. In 1979, he took the title of the first All-Japan Formula Three Championship.

In 1992, he won the 24 Hours of Daytona with Kazuyoshi Hoshino and Masahiro Hasemi. In the same year, he was runner-up in the Japanese F3000 championship.

Formula One
In , he participated in two Formula One Grands Prix, standing in for Philippe Alliot at the Larrousse team. Though he scored no championship points, Suzuki finished both races.

After Formula One
Suzuki competed mainly in national championships, including the Japanese Formula 3000 Championship (later Formula Nippon), Japanese Touring Car Championship (JTCC) and All-Japan Grand Touring Car Championship (JGTC). He also participated into the 24 Hours of Le Mans. In 1996, he made a single start in the NASCAR Busch Series, driving for Joe Bessey at Nazareth Speedway; an accident during the race left him with a concussion.

In 2006, he became director of the R&D SPORT in Super GT to continue the team that Direxiv abandoned.

GT-R
Most recently, he worked for Nissan as a test driver to help in the development of the R35 Nissan GT-R.

Motorsports career results

24 Hours of Le Mans results

Japanese Formula Two/Formula 3000/Formula Nippon results
(key) (Races in bold indicate pole position; races in italics indicate fastest lap)

Complete Japanese Touring Car Championship results
(key) (Races in bold indicate pole position) (Races in italics indicate fastest lap)

Complete JGTC results
(key) (Races in bold indicate pole position) (Races in italics indicate fastest lap)

Complete Formula One results
(key)

NASCAR
(key) (Bold – Pole position awarded by qualifying time. Italics – Pole position earned by points standings or practice time. * – Most laps led.)

Busch Series

References

External links

Profile at grandprix.com

{{succession box
|before=Marco Apicella 
|title=Japanese Formula 3000 Champion
|years=1995
|after=Ralf Schumacher(Formula Nippon)}}

Living people
1955 births
Sportspeople from Saitama Prefecture
Japanese racing drivers
24 Hours of Le Mans drivers
24 Hours of Daytona drivers
Japanese Formula One drivers
Japanese Formula 3000 Championship drivers
Formula Nippon drivers
Japanese Formula 3 Championship drivers
British Formula Three Championship drivers
NASCAR drivers
Super GT drivers
Japanese Touring Car Championship drivers
World Sportscar Championship drivers
Larrousse Formula One drivers
Long Distance Series drivers
TOM'S drivers
Team LeMans drivers
Toyota Gazoo Racing drivers
Nismo drivers